A pointed arch, ogival arch, or Gothic arch is an arch with a pointed crown, whose two curving sides meet at a relatively sharp angle at the top of the arch. This architectural element was particularly important in Gothic architecture. The earliest use of a pointed arch dates back to bronze-age Nippur. As a structural feature, it was first used in Islamic architecture, but in the 12th century it began to be used in France and England as an important structural element, in combination with other elements, such as the rib vault and later the flying buttress. These allowed the construction of cathedrals, palaces and other buildings with dramatically greater height and larger windows which filled them with light.

Early arches  
Crude arches pointed in shape have been discovered from the Bronze Age site of Nippur dated earlier than 2700 BC. The palace of Nineveh also has pointed arched drains but they have no true keystone.

A very early structure in the form of a pointed arch, carved from stone and dating from the 3rd century BC, was discovered in India at the Sitamarhi caves. Later, the temple of Trivikrama at Ter in Maharashtra India dated to Satavahana period also included a structure in the form of a pointed arch.  Another archaeological excavation by the Archaeological Survey of India (ASI) at Kausambi revealed a palace with its foundations going back to 8th century BC until 2nd century AD and built in six phases. The last phase, dated to 1st–2nd century, included a large structure with arches similar to four pointed arch, which were used to span narrow passageways, and an arch similar to segmental arch that crossed wider areas. However the actual shapes of those arches cannot be accurately determined because of irregular sizes of stones and missing arch-ring. Pointed arches with a load-bearing function were also found in Gandhara. There, a two pointed arch vault system was built inside the Bhitargaon temple, which is dated to early Gupta period (4th–5th century). Pointed arches also appeared in the Mahabodhi temple, an ancient Buddhist temple (6–7th century). These arches were result of 12-13th century Burmese restoration of the temple and weren't part of original construction.

Some scholars question the Indian origin of pointed arch. They argue that pointed arches were first used in the Near East in pre-Islamic architecture, but others have stated that these arches were, in fact, parabolic and not pointed arches.

Pointed arches – Islamic architecture   
 
Pre-Islamic pointed arches and some early Islamic pointed arches were decorative rather than structural in their functions. The earliest example of pointed arch as structural feature appeared in several early Iranian bridges of 10th and 11th century AD. The pointed arch became an early feature of architecture in the Middle East, It appeared in Islamic architecture during the Abbasid Caliphate in the middle of the 8th century CE. It appeared in Islamic architecture as a decorative feature in doorways, windows and niches in Mosques in Egypt, Turkey, Iran and Central Asia. It was also used by the Seljuk Turks  for the arches of reconstructed Roman bridges in Anatolia. such as the Eurymedon Bridge.

The most common form of pointed arch in Islamic architecture was the four-centred arch, which appeared frequently in the architecture of the Abbasids and especially that of Persianate cultures, including Mughal architecture and Persian architecture. It was also used in the Timurid Empire. Early examples include the portals of the Qubbat al-Sulaiybiyya, an octagonal pavilion, and the Qasr al-'Ashiq palace, both at Samarra, built by the  Abbasid caliphs in the 9th century for their new capital.

Gothic architecture – pointed arches and rib vaulting

Rib vaults 
In the 12th century, architects in England and France discovered a new use for the pointed arch. They began using the pointed arch to create the rib vault, which they used to cover the naves of abbeys and cathedrals. The first Gothic rib vault was built at Durham Cathedral in England in 1135.  Others appeared in the deambulatory of the Abbey of Saint Denis in Paris (1140–1144), Lessay Abbey in Normandy (1064–1178), Cefalù Cathedral in Sicily, (1131–1240). and the Cathedral of Notre-Dame de Paris.

The rib vault quickly replaced the Romanesque barrel vault in the construction of cathedrals, palaces, and other large structures.  In a barrel vault, the rounded arch over the nave pressed down directly onto the walls, which had to be very thick, with few windows, to support the weight. In the rib vault, the thin stone ribs of the pointed arches distributed the weight outwards and downwards to the rows of pillars below. The result was that the walls could be thinner and higher, and they could have large windows between the columns. With the addition of the flying buttress, the weight could be supported by curving columns outside the building, which meant that the Cathedrals could be even taller, with immense stained glass windows. 

In the earliest type of Gothic rib vault, the sexpartite vault, the vault had a transversal pointed arch, and was divided by the ribs into six compartments. It could only cross a limited amount of space, and required a system of alternating columns and pillars. This type was used in Sens Cathedral and Notre-Dame de Paris. A new version was soon introduced, which reduced the number of compartments from six to four, distributed the weight equally to four pillars, eliminating the need for alternating columns and pillars, and allowed the vault to span a wider space. This quadripartite vault was used at Amiens Cathedral, Chartres Cathedral, and Reims Cathedral, and gave these structures unprecedented height.

Portals 

Portals of Cathedrals in the Gothic period were usually in the form of a pointed arch, surrounded by sculpture, often symbolizing the entrance to heaven.

Windows

The window in the form of a pointed arch is a common characteristic of the Gothic style. Windows sometimes were constructed in the classical form of a pointed arch, which is denominated an "equilateral arch", while others had more imaginative forms that combined various geometric forms. One common form was the lancet window, a tall and slender window with a pointed arch, which took its name from the lance. Lancet windows were often grouped into sets, with two, three or four adjacent windows.

The late Gothic, also known as the Flamboyant Gothic, had windows with pointed arches that occupied nearly all the space of the walls. Notable examples are the windows of Sainte-Chapelle de Vincennes (1379–1480)

Forms 
The form of the Gothic pointed arch in windows and arches was typically based upon an equilateral triangle, in which the three sides have an equal length. This had the great advantage of simplicity. Stone cutters, or hewers, could precisely draw the arc on the stone with a cord and a marker. This allowed arch stones to be cut at the quarry in quantity with great precision, then delivered and assembled at the site, where the layers put them together, with the assurance that they would fit. The use of the equilateral triangle was given a theological explanation – the three sides represented the Holy Trinity. 

In the later years of the flamboyant Gothic the arches and windows often took on more elaborate forms, with tracery circles and multiple forms within forms. Some used a modification of the horseshoe arch, borrowed from Islamic architecture.

The Tudor Arch of the Late Gothic style was a variation of the Islamic four-centred arch.  A four-centred arch is a low, wide type of arch with a pointed apex. Its structure is achieved by drafting two arcs that rise steeply from each springing point on a small radius, and then turning into two arches with a wide radius and much lower springing point. It is a pointed sub-type of the general flattened depressed arch. Two of the most notable types are known as the Persian arch, which is moderately "depressed".

The Tudor arch, which is flatter than the Persian arch, was widely used in English architecture, particularly during the Tudor dynasty (1485–1603),

Revival of pointed arch 

Though the Gothic pointed arch was largely abandoned during the Renaissance, replaced by more classical forms, it reappeared in the 18th and 19th century, Gothic Revival architecture.  It was used in Strawberry Hill House, the residence in Twickenham, London built by Horace Walpole (1717–1797) from 1749 onward. It was usually used in churches and chapels, and later in the British  Houses of Parliament in London, (1840–1876) rebuilt after the earlier building was destroyed by a fire. In the 19th century, pointed arches appeared in varied structures, including the Gothic train station in Peterhof, Russia (1857).

Notes and citations

Bibliography

Further reading
  (in nine volumes)

Arches and vaults
Gothic architecture